Pekka Hämäläinen may refer to:

Pekka Hämäläinen (footballer) (1938–2013), Finnish association football player and administrator
Pekka Hämäläinen (historian), Finnish historian